Sailana Assembly constituency is one of the 230 Vidhan Sabha (Legislative Assembly) constituencies of Madhya Pradesh state in central India. This constituency came into existence in 1951 as one of the 79 Vidhan Sabha constituencies of the erstwhile Madhya Bharat state. It was abolished in 1956 but again came into existence in 1961. This constituency is reserved for the candidates belonging to the Scheduled tribes since its inception.

Overview
Sailana (constituency number 221) is one of the 5 Vidhan Sabha constituencies located in Ratlam district. This constituency covers the entire Bajna and Sailana tehsils of this district.

Sailana is part of Ratlam Lok Sabha constituency along with seven other Vidhan Sabha segments, namely, Ratlam Rural and Ratlam City in this district, Alirajpur and Jobat in Alirajpur district and Jhabua, Thandla and Petlawad in Jhabua district.

Members of Legislative Assembly
As a constituency of Madhya Bharat:
 1951: Jeta Bhagga, Indian National Congress

As a constituency of Madhya Pradesh:
 1962: Laxmansingh Jhitra, Socialist Party
 1967: Prabhudayal Gehlot, Indian National Congress
 1972: Prabhudayal Gehlot, Indian National Congress
 1977: Kamji Gamira, Janata Party
 1980: Prabhudayal Gehlot, Indian National Congress (Indira)
 1985: Prabhudayal Gehlot, Indian National Congress
 1990: Kamji Gamira, Janata Dal
 1993: Lahling Devra, Indian National Congress
 1998: Prabhudayal Gehlot, Independent
 2003: Prabhudayal Gehlot, Indian National Congress
 2008: Prabhudayal Gehlot, Indian National Congress
 2013: Smt Sangeeta Churel, Bharatiya Janata Party
 2018: Harsh Vijay Gehlot, Indian national congress

See also
 List of constituencies of Madhya Pradesh Vidhan Sabha
 Sailana

References

Ratlam district
Assembly constituencies of Madhya Pradesh